Farmville is a town in Pitt County, North Carolina, United States, eight miles to the west of Greenville. At the 2010 Census, the population was 4,654. Farmville is a part of the Greenville Metropolitan Area located in North Carolina's Inner Banks region. Farmville has been a Tree City USA community through the Arbor Day Foundation for 36 years, proving its commitment to managing and expanding its public trees. The Town government, in cooperation with other non-profit groups that work for the advancement of the town, sponsor annual events such as the Farmville Dogwood Festival, the Christmas Parade, Independence Day Celebration, A Taste of Farmville, and the Holiday Open House, among others.

History 
Established in February 1872, the town was named Farmville because all of its undertakings and activities were farm related. Among the influential founding fathers of Farmville, James Williams May and William Gray Lang made exceptional contributions to the towns development. Mr. James Williams May was a commissioner named in the original town charter. He donated sites for churches and was a business leader willing to invest his services and resources towards the success of the town. He was the grandson of Major Benjamin May. William Gray Lang served as a commissioner on the town board for more than 10 years. He also serviced on the executive committee appointed to establish the Tobacco Market in Farmville. The town grew slowly, with the 1880 census showing 111 in Farmville and 79 in Marlborough, a nearby unincorporated settlement along the wooden Historic Plank Road. The Marlborough settlement is now inside the town limits of Farmville. The cultivation of Tobacco in Pitt County and the Farmville area began in the 1890s, which helped bring the East Carolina Railway to Farmville in 1900. Most of buildings in downtown Farmville were built shortly after due to the economic boom the railroad helped begin.  The Farmville Historic District and Benjamin May-Lewis House are listed on the National Register of Historic Places.

Geography

Farmville is located at  (35.594246, −77.587128).

Little Contentnea Creek, a tributary to Contentnea Creek, passes to the north of Farmville.

Demographics

2020 census

As of the 2020 United States census, there were 4,461 people, 1,813 households, and 1,212 families residing in the town.

2014
As of the census of 2014, there were 5,012 people, 2,394 households, and 1,992 families residing in the town. The population density was 1,387.4 people per square mile (535.8/km2). There were 2,010 housing units at an average density of 648.2 per square mile (250.3/km2). The racial makeup of the town was 47.37% White, 50.09% African American, 0.07% Native American, 0.23% Asian, 1.19% from other races, and 1.05% from two or more races. Hispanic or Latino of any race were 2.12% of the population.

There were 1,839 households, out of which 26.6% had children under the age of 18 living with them, 38.8% were married couples living together, 22.5% had a female householder with no husband present, and 34.6% were non-families. 32.1% of all households were made up of individuals, and 16.9% had someone living alone who was 65 years of age or older. The average household size was 2.33 and the average family size was 2.93.

In the town, the population was spread out, with 23.9% under the age of 18, 7.4% from 18 to 24, 23.4% from 25 to 44, 26.3% from 45 to 64, and 18.9% who were 65 years of age or older. The median age was 42 years. For every 100 females, there were 77.7 males. For every 100 females age 18 and over, there were 71.6 males.

The median income for a household in the town was $29,229, and the median income for a family was $38,918. Males had a median income of $31,543 versus $21,968 for females. The per capita income for the town was $20,582. About 14.6% of families and 20.6% of the population were below the poverty line, including 32.8% of those under age 18 and 23.8% of those age 65 or over.

Education
Farmville is served by the Pitt County Schools district. Local public schools include:
 H. B. Sugg Elementary School (Previously K through 12) (Now Pre-K – 2nd)
 Sam D. Bundy Elementary School (3rd −5th)
 Farmville Middle School (6th – 8th)
 Farmville Central High School (9th −12th)
Pitt Community College, Farmville Center-This satellite campus serves as the hub for educational, workforce, and business services in southwest Pitt County, and surrounding counties. Classes are credits are offered to high school and college students, as well as individuals wanting to improve their skills and knowledge in a specific field.
The Glass Station-Glass Blowing art studio, classroom, and workshop for East Carolina University's School of Art and Design

Sports, Parks, and Recreation
Farmville is home to many public parks owned by the Town of Farmville, as well as multiple parks and sports venues owned by the Pitt County Schools System. The parks on school property are also available to the public. The primary complex and park in Farmville is the Farmville Municipal Athletic Complex, operated by the town's Parks and Recreation Department. It is only a block behind city hall and has many facilities and activities available. The following is a brief list of sports, parks, and recreation opportunities in Farmville.

 Farmville Municipal Athletic Complex: Full size football and soccer field, Babe Ruth Baseball Field,  youth baseball and softball field, double tennis court with fiberglass backboard, many batting cages/nets, paved walking trail loop, children's playground, multi-use auxiliary play area/field, restrooms, picnic shelter, and ample parking opportunities. 
 JY Monk Park: Public Park with large playground for children and youth, with multiple playsets and swings. Large sheltered picnic area available for lease for parties (contact Farmville Parks and Recreation), brand new Farmville Splash Park with restroom facilities, new pickle ball court, new sand volleyball court, park Street Gymnasium available for public use at certain hours,  large picnic tables in natural areas, and ample parking. 
 RT Monk Memorial Park: Public Park with large open play area, multiple playground structures, and picnic tables. Limited parking, but new roads and grassy area parking allow vehicle access.
 Farmville Disc Golf Course and Walking Trails: Brand new Championship Disc Golf Course with 18 challenging holes alongside a public fishing pond and the Little Contentnea Creek. Greenway walking is also allowed here, but visitors walking the greenway areas are encouraged to beware of flying discs if not playing disc golf. Ample parking and wide open playing areas, with two tee options for the Disc Golf course.
 Bennett Park and Playground: Large playground with multiple play structures, slides, and swings for children of all ages. This park also features two full size basketball courts with Championship goals. Plenty of street parking available.
 Oliver Murphy Walking Park: This park features a paved walking trail in a figure 8 pattern. Over a dozen workout stations along the trail make this park a public outdoor gym available for use anytime. While no parking lot, there is plenty of street parking available. Across Dale Drive from this walking trail park are several acres of outdoor play area for children and families.
 Farmville Golf and Country Club: Semi-Private Country Club founded in 1935 in Farmville. This 18 hole Golf Course has membership options, and allows non-members to play rounds of golf for a green fee and cart fee if applicable. The club also features a large swimming pool with pool only memberships available.

Notable people

 Sam D. Bundy – Member, North Carolina General Assembly
 Joseph Dixon (North Carolina politician) – United States Congressman (1870–1871)
 Roberta Flack – American singer, taught music in Farmville
 Blenda Gay – Former NFL player, murdered in 1976
 Walter B. Jones Sr. – United States Congressman (1967–1992)
 Walter B. Jones Jr. – United States Congressman (1993–2019)
 Elizabeth Schmoke Randolph (1917–2004), educator
 Terquavion Smith (born 2002) - college basketball player for the NC State Wolfpack of the Atlantic Coast Conference
 Mike Sutton – Head Basketball Coach, Tennessee Technological University
 Allen H. Turnage – General, United States Marine Corps
 Edith D. Warren – Member, North Carolina General Assembly

References

External links
 Official Farmville, NC website

Towns in Pitt County, North Carolina
Towns in North Carolina
Greenville, North Carolina metropolitan area